Maigret and Monsieur Charles (French: Maigret et Monsieur Charles) is a detective novel by the Belgian writer Georges Simenon, and is the last novel featuring his long-running character Jules Maigret.

Synopsis
Maigret is a few years short of his retirement and has just refused promotion to the post of Head of the Police Judiciare, preferring the human contact he enjoys as Head of the Criminal Division. His wish is granted when Madam Nathalie Sabin-Levesque, an elegant but highly nervous lady insists that he personally investigates the disappearance of her husband Gérard, a highly successful and rich Parisian lawyer.

With the assistance of various other detectives, but principally Lapointe, Maigret soon discovers that Madam Sabin-Levesque is virtually an alcoholic and has lived an effectively separate life from her husband, who regularly vanishes for days or weeks to take up with various girls. These are mostly hostesses picked up in bars and cabarets, and he is known to them as 'Monsieur Charles'. It further emerges that his wife was also a call-girl in her youth, although she has claimed to be a legal secretary. She hoped for a life of comfort and security with her new husband, who owned a villa in Cannes and inherited money, but they soon grew to ignore and despise each other. She knows nothing of his professional life and is not well liked by the staff at the practice.

When Gérard's body is fished out of the Seine, Maigret's suspicions fall on her. But she is also being blackmailed by pimp-turned-barman-turned-gigolo Jo Fazio, her sometime lover. It turns out that Fazio killed Gérard and that Nathalie then killed Fazio. Maigret somewhat reluctantly arrests Nathalie, knowing that she is in poor health and will spend time in the prison hospital.

Publication history
The French title was first published in 1972.

The first English version appeared in 1973, translated by Marianne Alexandre Sinclair as Maigret and Monsieur Charles.

Adaptations

References

1972 Belgian novels
Maigret novels
Novels set in Paris
Presses de la Cité books